Still in Hollywood is a collection of unreleased material, bonus tracks from singles, live tracks and cover songs from alternative rock band Concrete Blonde.

Track listing
 "It'll Chew You Up and Spit You Out" (alternate version of "Still in Hollywood" from Concrete Blonde)
 "Everybody Knows" (Leonard Cohen)
 "Free"
 "God Is a Bullet" (live)
 "Probably Will"
 "Mandocello" (Cheap Trick)
 "The Ship Song" (Nick Cave)
 "Joey" (live)
 "Little Wing" (Jimi Hendrix)
 "Roses Grow" (live)
 "The Sky Is a Poisonous Garden Tonight" (live)
 "Bloodletting" (extended version)
 "Simple Twist of Fate" (Bob Dylan)
 "Side of the Road"
 "100 Games of Solitaire"
 "Tomorrow, Wendy" (live)

References

Concrete Blonde albums
1994 compilation albums